Messervy may refer to 

Frank Messervy (1893–1974, a British soldier, first Commander-in-Chief of the Pakistan Army
John Albert Messervy (1861–1928), a Canadian industrialist 
William S. Messervy (1812–1886), an American trader and politician 
M (James Bond), in full Vice Admiral Sir Miles Messervy KCMG, a fictional British spymaster